Suga(r), originally stylized as '$ugǝ[r]', is the sixth studio album by Dutch rock band Claw Boys Claw. It's their first album on EMI productions. It is one of their commercially most successful albums, and musically it sees the former garage band move toward what would be called "swamp rock." It was the most successful album of their career, reaching #26 on 13 February 1993 on the Dutch album chart, and staying on the chart for 10 weeks. Of the three singles that came from the album, the first one, "Rosie," charted—the first time ever for a Claw Boys Claw single—and reached #22 on 30 January 1993.

The CD was reissued in 2008, with two extra tracks; "Spread That Jam (remix)" and "The Keeper" had earlier been released as a CD single.

Track listing

Personnel 
John Cameron – guitar
Pete TeBos – vocals
Geert de Groot – bass, backing vocals
Marc Lamb – drums
Marcel Schoots – percussion, production
Frank van der Weij – mix, engineering

See also
Claw Boys Claw discography

References 

1992 albums
Claw Boys Claw albums
EMI Records albums